Bahía Ballena is a district of the Osa canton, in the Puntarenas province of Costa Rica.

History 
Bahía Ballena was created on 23 July 1991 by Decreto Ejecutivo 20588-G.

Geography 
Bahía Ballena has an area of  km2 and an elevation of  metres.

Demographics 

For the 2011 census, Bahía Ballena had a population of  inhabitants.

Transportation

Road transportation 
The district is covered by the following road routes:
 National Route 34

References 

Districts of Puntarenas Province
Populated places in Puntarenas Province